George Forrest may refer to:

G. Topham Forrest (George Topham Forrest, 1872–1945), principal architect for the London County Council
George Forrest (author) (1915–1999), American author and musician
George Forrest (botanist) (1873–1932), Scottish botanist and plant collector
George Arthur Forrest (born 1940), Belgian businessman in the Belgian Congo
George William Forrest (1845–1926), British journalist and historian
George Forrest (Northern Ireland politician) (1921–1968), Ulster Unionist Member of Parliament for Mid Ulster
George Forrest (soccer) (1904–1986), Canadian international soccer player
George Forrest (VC) (1800–1859), Irish Victoria Cross recipient
George Forrest (U.S. politician) (c. 1870–?), mayor of Juneau, Alaska
George Forrest (historian) (1925–1997), professor at the University of Oxford
George W. Forrest (1838–1909), farmer and political figure in Nova Scotia

See also
Forrest (surname)